Pavoorchatram is a town in Tenkasi district, Tamil Nadu, India.

Geography 
Pavoorchatram situated in the foothills of Western Ghats, between Tuticorin and Quilon highway National highway. The nearest popular train stations are Tenkasi and Tirunelveli. Pavoorchatram has a railway station .

Villages in Tirunelveli district